Darinka Radović (Kloka, 6 January 1896-Rajkovac 23 May 1943) was a manual worker in agriculture and an activist for the Yugoslav Partisans during World War II in Yugoslavia and a People's Hero of Yugoslavia. She was killed together with her two daughters in May 1943 by Chetniks forces.

Biography
Darinka was born as a third child and a first daughter in a poor patriarchal family in the village of Kloka in January 1896. Since she was born on a Serbian Orthodox religious holiday she received the name Darinka (Dar=gift) from her godfather as she was considered to be a gift from God. At the time of her youth it was uncommon for girls in rural Kingdom of Serbia to be sent to school so Darinka never had a formal education and stayed illiterate. She brought sewing machine as a dowry at the time of her wedding. In 1941 her husband Vojislav, soldier in Royal Yugoslav Army, was sent as a prisoner of war to Nazi Germany.

In 1942 Yugoslav Partisans started to visit her house where she was giving them food, and place for wounded to stay. She, together with some other villager started to make clothes for them as well. Through this contact she and her two daughters learned more about political ideas of Partisan forces. She convinced other women in the village to help the Partisan forces and served as a messenger by delivering messages to other villages.

Once the Chetniks took control over the area they learned about Darinka and her daughters activities and organized a raid of her home. There was a wounded Partisan soldier at her home at that time, but he was not discovered. Chetniks were asking Darinka and her daughters to tell them where they are hiding a Partisan soldier, but all three of them claimed that there is no one at their place. Chetniks then took them to the church yard where they were exposed to torture. After they saw that they will not get information they want, Chetniks started to torture the youngest daughter Stanka threatening Darinka that they will slaughter her if Darinka does not tell them where is the Partisan and who in the village is helping the Partisan forces. Darika didn't say a word and Chetniks slaughtered Stanka. After that Chetniks took her older daughter Radmila and slaughtered her as well in front of the bounded Darinka. In the end, they slaughtered her as well.

By the Decree of president of Yugoslavia Josip Broz Tito Darinka Radović was declared People's Hero of Yugoslavia on 9 October 1953.

References

Radovic, Darinka
Radovic, Darinka
Radovic, Darinka
Radovic, Darinka
People killed by Chetniks during World War II